Boris Danilovich Korolyov (1884/85–1963) was a Soviet sculptor-monumentalist, teacher and public figure.

Biography
As an artist Korolyov stood at the origins of the Soviet school of sculpture, its mainstream, but he also was one of the leading figures in the avant-garde movement. In the 1920s he played a prime role in the realization of Lenin's plan of monumental propaganda. In his sculptural works Korolyov combined Realism with elements of Impressionism and Cubism.

Born in Moscow and educated at the Moscow School of Painting, Sculpture and Architecture under Sergei Volnukhin, Korolyov was a committed revolutionary, deported twice for his political activity, and a leading figure of avant-garde sculpture in revolutionary Russia.

He was an active participant in the execution of Lenin's Monumental Propaganda Plan of April 1918, which encouraged the destruction of Tsarist monuments and the rapid production of Soviet-themed sculptures and bas-reliefs.  However, Korolyov's rapidly produced 1919 concrete statue of Mikhail Bakunin, done in a Cubo-Futurist style and set up in Moscow, proved to be deeply unpopular and was dismantled within weeks.

Despite changing tastes, Korolyov continued working in Cubist style into the 1920s, and became professor of sculpture at the Soviet state art school, Vkhutemas. In 2009 he was the subject of a major retrospective at the Tretyakov Gallery.

Korolyov is buried in Novodevichy Cemetery.

Significant works
His work includes:
 the granite Fighters of the Revolution in Saratov, completed in 1925, with a cubist base
 bronze and granite figure of Nikolay Bauman, Moscow, 1931
 a number of statues of Lenin, including a bronze of Lenin in Independence Square of Tashkent, completed in 1936 and replaced in 1991

Gallery

References

External links 
 Online biography (in Russian)
 Bol'shaya sovetskaya entsiklopediia (the Great Soviet encyclopedia) (3d ed., vol. 13). (1973). Moscow.: Izdatel'stvo "Sovetskaya Entsiklopediya".
 Grabar. (Ed.). (1957). Istoriya Russkogo Iskusstva (The History of Russian Art) (Vol. XI). Moscow: USSR Academy of Sciences.
 Latushkin (1986). Pam'yatnik N.E. Baumanu (Monument to N. Bauman in Moscow). Moscow: Moskovskiy rabochiy.
 Fomina, Yakhont (1989). Korolyov, B.D. Iz literaturnogo naslediya. Perepiska. Sovremenniki o skul'ptore (Korolyóv, B.D. Excerpts from archives and published literary works.  Correspondence. Contemporaries on the sculptor. Moscow: Sovetskiy khudozhnik.

1880s births
1963 deaths
Academic staff of Vkhutemas
Russian avant-garde
Cubist artists
People's Artists of the USSR (visual arts)
Russian male sculptors
Soviet sculptors
Socialist realist artists
Burials at Novodevichy Cemetery
20th-century sculptors
Moscow School of Painting, Sculpture and Architecture alumni